Louis D. Matzel is a professor of psychology at Rutgers University. His research is in the fields of behavioral neuroscience and differential psychology, with a focus on individual differences in intelligence. He is also noted for his criticisms of the concept of long-term potentiation. He was a recipient of the James McKeen Cattell Fund Fellowship from the Association for Psychological Science in 1999–2000, and he has been a fellow of the Eastern Psychological Association since 2009.

References

External links
Faculty page

Living people
21st-century American psychologists
Rutgers University faculty
American neuroscientists
Differential psychologists
Intelligence researchers
American University alumni
George Mason University alumni
Binghamton University alumni
Year of birth missing (living people)